Meet Danny Wilson is a 1952 American drama musical film directed by Joseph Pevney and starring Frank Sinatra, Shelley Winters and Alex Nicol.

Sinatra, during his famous career slump between his bobby-soxer heyday and From Here to Eternity (1953), plays a small-time singer, who vaults to the top of his profession, only to be threatened by a gangster (Raymond Burr).

The circumstances of the making of this film are legendary, as Shelley Winters and Frank Sinatra hated each other.  Winters, according to Kitty Kelley's "His Way", at one point in a pique of anger slugged Sinatra.  He did not retaliate.

Plot
Hot-tempered singer Danny Wilson and easy-going pianist pal Mike Ryan get acquainted with Joy Carroll, also a singer. Danny slugs a cop and is thrown in jail, but Joy arranges his bail and a job at mobster Nick Driscoll's club.

Danny's got double trouble because Nick not only demands 50% of all earnings, past and future, but also jealously loves Joy. The cops are keeping an eye on Nick, a suspect in a murder.

Joy eventually realizes that she truly loves Mike, but he is reluctant to steal his best friend's girl. Danny brashly announces his engagement to Joy without first consulting her. Danny catches her with Mike, gets drunk, and punches Nick, who pulls a gun. Mike intercepts the bullet meant for his friend.

Cops follow Danny to a park, where he intends to get even with Nick. At the last second, the police save him. Danny comes to accept the romance of Joy and Mike, who happily come to see him at his next big engagement on stage.

Cast
 Frank Sinatra as Danny Wilson
 Shelley Winters as Joy Carroll
 Alex Nicol as Mike Ryan
 Raymond Burr as Nick Driscoll alias Joe Martell
 Vaughn Taylor as T.W. Hatcher
 Tommy Farrell as Tommy Wells
 Donald MacBride as Police Desk Sergeant
 Barbara Knudson as Marie
 Carl Sklover as Cab driver

Production
The film features cameos from Tony Curtis and Jeff Chandler.

Sinatra had gone through a painful separation from first wife Nancy Sr. before the filming. Due to a major career slump, money issues and his volatile relationship with Ava Gardner, Sinatra began to lose weight from his already thin frame. Co-star Shelley Winters, already in a contentious feud with the star, began to get concerned because she was looking increasingly bulky by comparison.

Songs
• "You're a Sweetheart" (music by Jimmy McHugh; lyrics by Harold Adamson) – Performed by Frank Sinatra 

• "Lonesome Man Blues" (written by Sy Oliver) – Performed by Frank Sinatra with Danny Welton on harmonica 

• "She's Funny That Way" (music by Neil Moret; lyrics by Richard A. Whiting) – Performed by Frank Sinatra 

• "A Good Man Is Hard to Find" (written by Eddie Green) – Performed by Shelley Winters; Reprised by Frank Sinatra and Shelley Winters 

• "That Old Black Magic" (music by Harold Arlen; lyrics by Johnny Mercer – Performed by Frank Sinatra 

• "When You're Smiling" (written by Mark Fisher, Joe Goodwin and Larry Shay) – Performed by Frank Sinatra 

• "All of Me" (music by Gerald Marks; lyrics by Seymour Simons) – Performed by Frank Sinatra 

• "I've Got a Crush on You" (music by George Gershwin; lyrics by Ira Gershwin) – Performed by Frank Sinatra 

• "How Deep Is the Ocean?" (written by Irving Berlin) – Performed by Frank Sinatra

References

External links
 
 
 

1952 films
1950s musical drama films
1950s romantic musical films
American musical drama films
American romantic musical films
Films about singers
Films directed by Joseph Pevney
Universal Pictures films
1952 drama films
American black-and-white films
1950s English-language films
1950s American films